Craig Sechler (born September 8, 1951) is an American film and voice actor, based in Washington D.C.

Life and career
Sechler was born on September 8, 1951 and grew up in Cranbury, New Jersey. He grew up doing commercials and professional singing with his family which lead him in to his acting/voice acting career. Sechler is married to Julie Waterman, and has five children.

Sechler voices the characters Butch DeLoria, Sticky, and Harkness in Bethesda Softworks' game Fallout 3;  he also appeared in The Elder Scrolls IV: Oblivion as the default voice of the elves, and voiced the game Star Trek: Legacy.

He also voiced The World Trade Center: Anatomy of the Collapse, the Nature series, the Incredible Human Machine and Decoding COVID-19.

Credits

Film 
The Replacements (2000) as Reporter #3.
Mighty Aphrodite (1995) as Chorus Voice.
Home of Angels (1994) as Dad.
Once Around (1991) as Additional Voices.
A Shock to the System (1990) as Additional Dialogue.
The Wacky World of Mother Goose (1967)

Television 
Legacy (1999), Episode: "A House Divided" as Benjamin.
The Big World of Little Adam (1964), as Little Adam's older brother Wilbur.

Video games 
Fallout 3 (2008) as Butch/Harkness/Crazy Wolfgang/Sticky/Billy Creel/Talon Company mercenaries/Pronto/Sgt Benjamin Montgomery/Andy Stahl.
Star Trek: Legacy (2006) as Captain Hollister/ENT crew/Klingon/Romulan.
Call of Cthulhu: Dark Corners of the Earth (2005) as Jack Walters/Madman/Evil Mutant.
The Elder Scrolls IV: Oblivion (2006) as Sheogorath(Pre-Shivering Isles), High Chancellor Ocato, Barbas, High Elf, Wood Elf, Dark Elf Males and Adoring Fan.
The Elder Scrolls V: Skyrim (2011) as male ghosts, Gallus, Peryite and Hircine.

References

External links 

1951 births
Living people
Male actors from New Jersey
Male actors from Washington, D.C.
American male voice actors